Markus Esser (born 3 February 1980 in Leverkusen) is a retired German hammer throw. His personal best is 81.10 metres, achieved in July 2006 in Leverkusen. This ranks him eighth among German hammer throwers, behind Ralf Haber, Heinz Weis, Karsten Kobs, Günther Rodehau, Holger Klose, Christoph Sahner and Klaus Ploghaus.

He won his only major international medal, the bronze at 2006 European Championships retrospectively after the disqualification of the original winner, Belarusian Ivan Tikhon.

Achievements

References

External links
 
 
 
Leverkusen who's who

1980 births
Living people
Sportspeople from Leverkusen
German male hammer throwers
Olympic male hammer throwers
Olympic athletes of Germany
Athletes (track and field) at the 2000 Summer Olympics
Athletes (track and field) at the 2004 Summer Olympics
Athletes (track and field) at the 2008 Summer Olympics
World Athletics Championships athletes for Germany
European Athletics Championships medalists
German national athletics champions